Cenchritis muricatus is a species of sea snail in the family Littorinidae, the winkles or periwinkles. It occurs in the Caribbean Sea, the Gulf of Mexico and the Lesser Antilles. It is known commonly as the beaded periwinkle.

This snail often crawls out of the water and climbs vertical rocky cliffs to heights of over 14 meters, where it avoids desiccation and overheating by hiding in moist crevices.

References

Further reading
 Reid, D. G. (1989a). The comparative morphology, phylogeny and evolution of the gastropod family Littorinidae. Philosophical Transactions of the Royal Society of London, Series B 324: 1–110.
 Rosenberg, G., et al. 2009. Gastropoda (Mollusca) of the Gulf of Mexico, Pp. 579–699 in Felder, D. L. and D. K. Camp (eds.). Gulf of Mexico–Origins, Waters, and Biota. Biodiversity. Texas A&M Press, College Station, Texas.

Littorinidae
Gastropods described in 1758
Taxa named by Carl Linnaeus